Rasiah S. Sugirtharajah, known as R. S. Sugirtharajah, is a biblical hermeneuticist and an emeritus professor at the University of Birmingham. He is known for his work in developing the field of postcolonial biblical criticism.

Biography 
Born in Sri Lanka, Sugirtharajah pursued his Bachelor of Divinity and Master of Theology degrees at United Theological College, Bangalore (affiliated to the Senate of Serampore College) in India before completing his Doctor of Philosophy degree at the University of Birmingham in England. He is best known for his work in introducing postcolonial criticism to the study of the Bible, in works such as Asian Biblical Hermeneutics and Postcolonialism and Postcolonial Criticism and Biblical Interpretation. He is also known for bringing to the foreground marginalized voices which are rarely heard in mainstream studies of Christianity.

In 2009, a volume was published in Sugirtharajah's honour entitled Postcolonial Interventions.

Works

See also 
 Postcolonial theology

References 

Academics of the University of Birmingham
Alumni of the University of Birmingham
Living people
Biblical scholars
World Christianity scholars
Year of birth missing (living people)
Sri Lankan academics
Nationality missing
Senate of Serampore College (University) alumni